Zdenko Uzorinac (1929–2005) was a Croatian table tennis player, coach, journalist and sports writer.

Uzorinac competed at four World Table Tennis Championships, winning a bronze medal in the Swaythling Cup (men's team event) at the 1951 World Table Tennis Championships.

Sources
The Legend Retires
Umro Zdenko Uzorinac 
From 1965 Uzorinac coached ASTK Mladost Zagreb and in the three year period the club won three national club titles

See also
 List of table tennis players
 List of World Table Tennis Championships medalists

References

1929 births
2005 deaths
Croatian male table tennis players
Croatian table tennis coaches
Sportspeople from Zagreb
20th-century Croatian people
21st-century Croatian people